Arturo & Kiwi (Le ricette di Arturo e Kiwi) is an Italian animated television series, characterized in a comic way (but with Educational value), which illustrates in four minutes various recipes, typical of Italian regional cuisine.

History

Production 
Arturo & Kiwi was created and development in 2006 by Andrea Zingoni, one of the founders of Giovanotti Mondani Meccanici. The animation was produced by the Cartobaleno studio. In the two-year period 2006–2007 were realized two series of 13 episodes each, with Italian recipes, in 2008 a third series of 13 episodes was produced, entitled Arturo & Kiwi – Cooking for puppies with international recipes, and two years later a fourth series always with 13 episodes with the same title but with Italian and international recipes.

The first series was aired from 7 May 2007 initially from Monday to Friday within the television program for kids Trebisonda, in the afternoon on Rai 3, to then move from the 12th of the same month exclusively to Saturday and Sunday in the morning, time slot maintained for the transmission of the remaining episodes of the first season and for all those of the second. Subsequently the program was always hosted on Rai 3, on Sunday morning, inside È domenica papà, where the third and fourth series were also aired. Occasionally it also aired in La prova del cuoco by Rai 1.

In 2007 the series won the High Quality Award for Childhood Il Grillo while in 2010 an application was published for the iPad where the two protagonists always explained in a humorous way the advice of use of utensils and kitchen appliances, along with some rules of etiquette.

Origin 
The series is an evolution of some cartoons made some years before by Zingoni and Held and aired on the My-Tv internet portal. The series was called La Cucina Ginese, since in the first two episodes of the total six was Gino the Chicken, another important creature of the draftsman to act as assistant to the chef Q-Gino, who was none other than the cock of the logo of the Riso Gallo. In fact, the series was a sort of advertising spot for the various types of cereals produced by the company. In this series the Kiwi makes its absolute debut, first as an "ingredient" found by Gino and then, starting from the third episode, as a cooking assistant. During the episodes of La Cucina Ginese some jokes and tormentos are recognizable that today characterize the duet Arturo and Kiwi. Therefore the series can be considered a link between the two works of Zingoni. The six episodes were available online before on the official website and subsequently on the official YouTube channel of Riso Gallo since December 2013.

Characters 
The strip has two characters, with the style of the comic duet. Often the kitchen changes some furnishing details, to adapt to the city or nation of the presented dish. In the presentation of the recipes a meter is adopted to define the difficulty called "Grado Kiwi" (Kiwi Grade) with values starting from 1 (very easy) to 7 (challenging).

Arturo 
Arturo, the cook, is a surly (but basically good-natured) Neapolitan Mastiff who, as he himself says, has left his heart in Naples. He is a very refined and prepared "chef" and his role is to introduce and illustrate the recipes. In the squabbles with Kiwi it is often to repeat the catchphrase "Mammina mia give me the strength!". Among the various aprons worn, it often carries one with the words "Italians do it better" (Madonna's famous slogan) and sometimes one with "we are the champions" (with the background of the Italian tricolor). When exposing a recipe in which the eggs are used, in the first two series it was ensured that they were not of the Kiwi. In some episodes he makes it clear that he is a pacifist and that he hates weapons. In the episode "Salsicce e fagioli all'uccelletto" receives a call from his "treasure" (perhaps his wife), who wants it at the pentolaccia (where a double plaid is up for grabs). Arturo's voice is that of Bruno Rucoli (1941–2016).

Kiwi 
Kiwi, the assistant, is a distorted New Zealand kiwi. It has the role of materially preparing the recipes, it is a "good fork" and has a passion for fine wines and spirits, and in fact every time he tries to drink it he is punctually reproached by Arturo. His entrances on the stage are always "curtain-raisers", in which he presents himself with curious costumes, to then take them off, to attack tormentons such as "Kiwi, kiwi allelujah!" and (often) to be pan-fried by Arturo. This entry into the scene, the linguistic misunderstandings with Arturo on some culinary terms, the tone of voice and the appearance of a chick, make it the "side" of the comedy duet. The character also talks about replacing the vowels at the end of the word with the "u" and is shown as a Latin lover, often on the phone with his conquests, but we also know that he is married with children ("tengu figli, cane, gattu... and picciuncina "). Although skilled in the kitchen, when he is dealing with fire he is almost always overwhelmed by a blaze, arousing the hilarity of Arturo. Kiwi's voice is that of Andrea Zingoni.

Artificial cob 
A living cob that acts like a zombie appears only in the initials and appears to be the only antagonist.

See also
List of Italian television series

2007 Italian television series debuts
2010 Italian television series endings
Italian children's animated comedy television series
RAI original programming